Swan Bluff is an unincorporated community in Hickman County, in the U.S. state of Tennessee.

History
A post office called Swan Bluff was established in 1874, and remained in operation until it was discontinued in 1914. The community was named from a nearby natural bluff.

References

Unincorporated communities in Hickman County, Tennessee
Unincorporated communities in Tennessee